is a JR West Geibi Line station located in 5-chōme, Fukawa, Asakita-ku, Hiroshima, Hiroshima Prefecture, Japan.

Station building and platforms
Nakafukawa Station features one side platform capable of handling one line. Trains bound for Shiwaguchi and Miyoshi are handled on the upper end (上り) of the platform, and trains bound for Hiroshima are handled on the lower end (下り). The station building, as with the building at Kamifukawa Station, is used as convenient meeting place for the residents of the surrounding area. The station is unmanned but features an automated ticket vending machine.

Environs
Hiroshima Nakafukawa Post Office
Hiroshima Municipal Kōyō Branch Office
Hiroshima Prefectural Kōyō Higashi High School
Hiroshima Prefectural Hiroshima Yōgo High School
Hiroshima Municipal Kamezaki Junior High School
Hiroshima Municipal Kōyō Junior High School
Hiroshima Municipal Fukawa Elementary School
Hiroshima Municipal Kamezaki Elementary School
Misasa River

Highway access
 Hiroshima Prefectural Route 37 (Hiroshima-Miyoshi Route)
 Hiroshima Prefectural Route 70 (Hiroshima-Nakashima Route)

Connecting lines
All lines are JR West lines. 
Geibi Line
Miyoshi Express
No stop
Commuter Liner
No stop
Miyoshi Liner/Local
Kamifukawa Station — Nakafukawa Station — Shimofukawa Station

External links
 JR West

Railway stations in Hiroshima Prefecture
Railway stations in Japan opened in 1923
Geibi Line
Hiroshima City Network
Stations of West Japan Railway Company in Hiroshima city